This is a list of legislators elected to the State Great Khural at the 2008 legislative election.

Composition at dissolution

Constituency

Changes & by-elections
 Dashdorjiin Zorigt (June 2009, vacated by Tsakhiagiin Elbegdorj)

Legislative election (List of Mps)
Elections in Mongolia
2008 election (List of Mps)